An open API (often referred to as a public API) is a publicly available application programming interface that provides developers with programmatic access to a proprietary software application or web service. APIs are sets of requirements that govern how one application can communicate and interact with another. APIs can also allow developers to access certain internal functions of a program, although this is not typically the case for web APIs. In the simplest terms, an API allows one piece of software to interact with another piece of software, whether within a single computer via a mechanism provided by the operating system or over an internal or external TCP/IP-based or non-TCP/IP-based network. Currently, many APIs are provided by organizations for access with HTTP. APIs may be used by both developers inside the organisation that published the API or by any developers outside that organisation who wish to register for access to the interface.

Characteristics 
Open APIs have three main characteristics:
 They are available for use by developers and other users with relatively few restrictions. Restrictions might include the necessity to register with the service providing the API.
 They are typically backed by open data. Open data is freely available for everyone to use and republish as they wish, without restrictions from copyright, patents or other mechanisms of control. An Open API may be free to use but the publisher may limit how the API data can be used.
 They are based on an open standard.

Open API versus private API

Private API 
A private API is an interface that opens parts of an organization's backend data and application functionality for use by developers working within (or contractors working for) that organization. Private APIs are only exposed to internal developers therefore the API publishers have total control over what and how applications are developed. Private APIs offer substantial benefits with regards to internal collaboration. Using a private API across an organization allows for greater shared awareness of the internal data models. As the developers are working for (or contracted by) one organization, communication will be more direct and therefore they should be able to work more cohesively as a group. Private APIs can significantly diminish the development time needed to manipulate and build internal systems that maximise productivity and create customer-facing applications that improve market reach and add value to existing offerings.

Open API 
In contrast to a private API, an open API is publicly available for all developers to access. They allow developers, outside of an organization's workforce, to access backend data that can then be used to enhance their own applications. Open APIs can significantly increase revenue without the business having to invest in hiring new developers making them a very profitable software application.  However, it is important to remember that opening back end information to the public can create a range of security and management challenges. For example, publishing open APIs can make it harder for organisations to control the experience end users have with their information assets. Open API publishers cannot assume client apps built on their APIs will offer a good user experience. Furthermore, they cannot fully ensure that client apps maintain the look and feel of their corporate branding.

Open APIs in business 
Open APIs can be used by businesses seeking to leverage the ever-growing community of freelancing developers who have the ability to create innovative applications that add value to their core business. Open APIs are favoured in the business sphere as they simultaneously increase the production of new ideas without investing directly in development efforts. Businesses often tailor their APIs to target specific developer audiences that they feel will be most effective in creating valuable new applications. However, an API can significantly diminish an application's functionality if it is overloaded with features.  

For example, Yahoo's open search API allows developers to integrate Yahoo search into their own software applications. The addition of this API provides search functionality to the developer's application whilst also increasing search traffic for Yahoo's search engine hence benefitting both parties. With respect to Facebook and Twitter, we can see how third parties have enriched these services with their own code. For example, the ability to create an account on an external site/app using your Facebook credentials is made possible using Facebook's open API.

Many large technology firms, such as Twitter, LinkedIn and Facebook, allow the use of their service by third parties and competitors.

Open APIs on the Web 
With the rise in prominence of HTML5 and Web 2.0, the modern browsing experience has become interactive and dynamic and this has, in part, been accelerated through the use of open APIs. Some open APIs fetch data from the database behind a website and these are called Web APIs. For example, Google's YouTube API allows developers to integrate YouTube into their applications by providing the capability to search for videos, retrieve standard feeds, and see related content.

Web APIs are used for exchanging information with a website either by receiving or by sending data. When a web API fetches data from a website, the application makes a carefully constructed HTTP request to the server the site is stored on. The server then sends data back in a format your application expects (if you requested data) or incorporates your changes to the website (if you sent data).

See also 
OpenAPI Specification
Application enablement
Open system (computing)
Mashup (web application hybrid)
Webhook
Web API

External links 
 Open API Initiative (OAI) website
  Eclipse OpenAPI (OAS) Editor and Studio
 OpenAPI Editor and Test Studio Usage Wiki

References 

Application programming interfaces